Psorophorus is a genus of lichenized fungi in the family Pannariaceae. It contains 2 known species.

Psorophorus was described as a new genus in 2010 when it was separated from the closely related genus Psoroma. Psorophorus species differ from other species in the family in being corticolous, having adpressed squamules on a distinct, dark prothallus, lacking melanins, having a thin cortical layer and a simpler apical ascus structure.

Species
 Psorophorus pholidotus (Mont.) Elvebakk & S.G.Hong
 Psorophorus fuegiensis (Zahlbr.) Elvebakk & S.G.Hong

References

Lichen genera
Peltigerales
Peltigerales genera